On-U Sound Records is an English record label known for releasing its own unique flavour of dub music since the 1980s. The label was founded by Adrian Sherwood in 1979/1980 and is home to acts such as Tackhead, Dub Syndicate, African Head Charge, Akabu, The London Underground, Little Annie, Creation Rebel, Mark Stewart, Gary Clail (who would have a number of Top 40 hits, like "Human Nature", credited to Gary Clail On-U Sound System), New Age Steppers, Audio Active, Asian Dub Foundation, and the dub collective Singers & Players.

See also
 List of record labels

References

External links
 Official site
 Unofficial site with extensive artist information and discography.
Discography at Discogs

 
British record labels
Electronic music record labels
Dub music
Sound systems